Romano Bonaventura (before 1216–20 February 1243) was a Catholic Christian prelate, Cardinal deacon of Sant'Angelo in Pescheria, his titulus (1216–1234), bishop of Porto-Santa Rufina (1231–1243), a cardinal-legate to the court of France.

He was also listed as Romano Papareschi, which strongly suggests that he came from the Roman family, probably of the rione Trastevere, that produced Gregorio Papareschi (died 1143), Pope Innocent II. He was archpriest of the Basilica di Santa Maria Maggiore (1220–1243). He took part in the Papal election, 1216, the Papal election, 1227, and the Papal election, 1241, at which Romano was prominent among the papabili known to wish to continue Gregory IX's hostility towards Frederick II, Holy Roman Emperor, who surrounded Rome with his armies, blocking the arrival of some cardinal electors known to be hostile to his interests.

Romano was a jurist. As cardinal-legate to France, he summoned the Council of Bourges (1225), directed towards funding the Albigensian Crusade.

Notes 

13th-century Italian cardinals
People of the Albigensian Crusade
1243 deaths
Year of birth unknown
House of Papareschi
Year of birth uncertain
13th-century Italian Roman Catholic bishops